The 2021–22 Nemzeti Bajnokság I (known as the K&H női kézilabda liga for sponsorship reasons) was the 71st season of the Nemzeti Bajnokság I, Hungarian premier Handball league.

Team information 
As in the previous season, 14 teams played in the 2020–21 season.
After the 2020–21 season, Békéscsabai Előre NKSE and Boglári Akadémia-SZISE were relegated to the 2021–22 Nemzeti Bajnokság I/B. They were replaced by two clubs from the 2020–21 Nemzeti Bajnokság I/B; Moyra-Budaörs Handball and Vasas SC.

Personnel and kits
Following is the list of clubs competing in 2021–22 Nemzeti Bajnokság I, with their president, head coach, kit manufacturer and shirt sponsor.

Managerial changes

League table

Schedule and results
In the table below the home teams are listed on the left and the away teams along the top.

Season statistics

Top goalscorers

Attendances

1: Team played in the Nemzeti Bajnokság I/B in the previous season.

Updated after the 2021/22 season. 
Attendance numbers without playoff matches.

Number of teams by counties

Hungarian clubs in European competitions

See also
 2021–22 Magyar Kupa
 2021–22 Nemzeti Bajnokság I/B
 2021–22 Nemzeti Bajnokság II

References

External links
 Hungarian Handball Federaration 
 handball.hu
 kezitortenelem.hu

Nemzeti Bajnokság I (women's handball)
Hungary
Nemzeti Bajnoksag I Women
2021 in women's handball
2022 in women's handball